Alexander Ivanovich Zemlin (born 2 January 1991) is a Russian sport shooter.

He participated at the 2018 ISSF World Shooting Championships, winning a medal.

References

External links

Living people
1991 births
Russian male sport shooters
Skeet shooters
Sportspeople from Krasnodar
Universiade gold medalists for Russia
Universiade medalists in shooting
European Games competitors for Russia
Shooters at the 2015 European Games
Shooters at the 2019 European Games
Medalists at the 2013 Summer Universiade